Hilltop Manor, now known as The Cavalier, is an historic structure located in the  Columbia Heights neighborhood in the  Northwest Quadrant of Washington, D.C.  This building is one of several developments between architect Harvey H. Warwick and developer Morris Cafritz, and is one of the first cooperative apartment buildings in the city.  The building was opened in 1927 along the 14th Street streetcar line.  Its size and density shows the rapid growth Washington experienced along major thoroughfares after World War I.  It was listed on the National Register of Historic Places in 2007.

References

Columbia Heights, Washington, D.C.
Residential buildings completed in 1927
Apartment buildings in Washington, D.C.
Renaissance Revival architecture in Washington, D.C.
Residential buildings on the National Register of Historic Places in Washington, D.C.